The Sir Ganga Ram Hospital is a 675-bed multi-speciality private hospital in Rajendra Nagar, Delhi. It provides comprehensive medical services to patients from all over Southeast Asia. The hospital's Minimal Access Surgery department was the first such department in South Asia.

The Sir Ganga Ram Hospital received the Award for "Economic Times Best Healthcare brand for Multi-speciality Hospitals in India" presented by J.P.Nadda, the Union Health Minister of Government of India on 26 June 2016.

The Sir Ganga Ram Hospital also provides training to young doctors under the Diplomate in National Board (DNB) program. The DNB program at the hospital was started in 1984 and currently runs the largest number of DNB specialties in the country. It has the distinction of having the first bone bank in India.

On 29 March 2019, the Sir Ganga Ram Hospital became the first large hospital in Delhi to join AB-PMJAY.

History
The original hospital was first founded in 1921 at Lahore, British India (now Pakistan) by Sir Ganga Ram (1851–1927), a civil engineer and leading philanthropist of his times. Following WWII and after the Partition of India in 1947, this second hospital was established in New Delhi on a plot of land approximately 11 acres. The foundation was laid in April 1951 by the then Prime Minister of India Shri Jawahar Lal Nehru under the auspices of Dharma Vira, who at the time was also Principal Private Secretary to the Prime Minister. The hospital was later inaugurated by him on 13 April 1954. Dharma Vira, son in law of Sir Gangaram is also known as the Chief Architect and Founder of the Sir Gangaram Hospital in New Delhi.

The hospital nearly closed due to lack of funds in the 1970s. It was restructured by Dr. K.C. Mahajan, one of New Delhi's notable general surgeons, in 1981. As chairman of the Board of Management, Dr. Mahajan revised the financial and functional structure of the hospital and opened the Mahajan Imaging Diagnostics Centre inside the premises of the Sir Ganga Ram Hospital. He still serves as an Emeritus Consultant in the hospital's department of general surgery. The lessons learned in the 1970s changed the hospital focus from being service oriented to being profitable with a high quality canteen service

Dr.S.K.Bhandari established the gynaecology and obstetrics Department at Sir Ganga Ram Hospital and worked for 58 years before succumbing to heart failure and COVID-19 at the age of 86 years.Dr.Bhandari is said to have delivered several prominent personalities including Congress leaders Rahul Gandhi and Priyanka Gandhi and her children.

References

External links
Official website

Hospital buildings completed in 1954
Hospitals in Delhi
Hospitals established in 1954
1954 establishments in India
20th-century architecture in India